Herbert Hauswald (born 4 March 1912, date of death unknown) was a German racing cyclist. He rode in the 1937 Tour de France.

References

External links
 

1912 births
Year of death missing
German male cyclists
Place of birth missing
People from Sebnitz
Cyclists from Saxony
20th-century German people